Anne Njemanze, is an actress in Nigerian cinema. She is most notable for the roles in the films Domitila, Tinsel, Ìrètí and Colourless.

Personal life
She was married to fellow Nollywood actor Segun Arinze, which later became a short-lived marriage. The couple has one daughter, Renny Morenike, who was born on 10 May.

In November 2013, she remarried Silver Ojieson. However, it also lasted less than eight months till July 2014 due to issues relating to bouts of domestic violence, abuse and battery.

Shortly after the divorce from first marriage, she met with an accident in Calabar, Cross River State. Due to the accident, the Imo state-born actress from Owerri was terribly damaged. Nevertheless, Njemanze remained on clutches for 2 years.

Career
In 1994, Njemanze appeared as Ritchie Haatrope's spoilt girlfriend Temi Badmus in Checkmate, and played Amara, Ahanna's girlfriend in the 1995 movie Rattlesnake. Her breakthrough role was as the title character in Domitilla, and later the sequel Domitilla II. Later she acted in the film True Confession alongside Liz Benson.

In 2012, she played Inspector Sankey in the blockbuster hit M-Net series Tinsel.

Filmography

References

External links
 
 Nollywood actress Anne Njemanze celebrates daughter on her birthday
 Nollywood actress, Anne Njemanze celebrates her daughter who turns a year older today

Living people
Year of birth missing (living people)
Nigerian television actresses
20th-century Nigerian actresses
Nigerian film actresses
21st-century Nigerian actresses